Marianne Leone Cooper (born January 2, 1952) is an American film and television actress, screenwriter and essayist. Her  longest-running recurring role was playing Christopher Moltisanti's mother on The Sopranos.

Personal life
Cooper was born Marianne Leone in Boston, Massachusetts, to Italian immigrants.  She married actor Chris Cooper in 1983. In 1987, their son, Jesse Lanier Cooper, was born. Three months premature, Jesse developed a cerebral hemorrhage and cerebral palsy. After searching for the best schools for children with special needs, Cooper and Leone moved to Kingston, Massachusetts, where they became strong advocates for disabled children.

On January 3, 2005, Jesse Cooper died from SUDEP. A memorial fund was set up in his name, the Jesse Cooper Foundation . Leone's memoir, Knowing Jesse: A Mother's Story of Grief, Grace, and Everyday Bliss, was published in September 2010 by Simon & Schuster.

She and her husband Chris Cooper adopt and live with rescue dogs.

Career

Acting 
Leone has had roles in several films, including The Thin Blue Line (1988), True Love (1989),  Goodfellas (1990), Household Saints (1993) and The Three Stooges (2012). She has also acted in a small number of television series, including Kate & Allie (1985) and Brotherhood (2007). Her longest-running recurring role was playing Christopher Moltisanti's mother in nine episodes of The Sopranos from 2002 to 2007.

Writing 
Leone's essays have appeared in The Boston Globe. Her essay "Knitting: Epic Fail" appears in the anthology Knitting Yarns: Writers on Knitting, published by W. W. Norton & Company in 2013.

Her screenplay, Hurricane Mary, is a true life story of a mother's struggles to have her disabled twin daughters integrated into the public school system. It is being made into a movie starring Chris Cooper, William H. Macy and Meryl Streep.

Bibliography
 Ma Speaks Up: And a First-Generation Daughter Talks Back, Beacon Press, 2017, 
 Knowing Jesse: A Mother's Story of Grief, Grace, and Everyday Bliss, Simon & Schuster, 2010,

Partial filmography
True Love (1989) - Carmella
Goodfellas (1990) - Tuddy's Wife
Mortal Thoughts (1991) - Aunt Rita
City of Hope (1991) - Joann
Household Saints (1993) - Sr. Cupertino
The 24 Hour Woman (1999) - Cable Executive #1
Hair Under the Roses (2000) - Fille du bal 1
Loosies (2011) - Rita Corelli
The Three Stooges (2012) - Sister Ricarda
Joy (2015) - Sharon

References

External links

Knowing Jesse: Among the Books of 2010, a Life Lesson
interview on Radio Open Source

1952 births
American film actresses
American television actresses
American women screenwriters
Screenwriters from Massachusetts
American writers of Italian descent
Living people
Actresses from Boston
People from Kingston, Massachusetts
20th-century American actresses
21st-century American actresses